The Electronic Entertainment Expo 2019 (E3 2019) was the 25th E3, during which hardware manufacturers, software developers, and publishers from the video game industry presented new and upcoming products to the attendees, primarily retailers and members of the video game press. The event, organized by the Entertainment Software Association (ESA), took place at the Los Angeles Convention Center from June 11–13, 2019. Many companies held its press conferences in the days prior, with the exception of Sony, which skipped the event for the first time.

No new gaming hardware was revealed, though Microsoft announced it was starting work on the next-generation Xbox, whereas Sony had discussed its own preparatory work for the next PlayStation consoles, both which were released in 2020. Most announcements at E3 were focused on new games, many set to release from late 2019 through early 2020. A strong emphasis was made on subscription services, such as Xbox Game Pass and Uplay Plus, as well as streaming services such as Stadia.

Format and changes 
E3 2019 ran from June 11–13, 2019 in the Los Angeles Convention Center. In the days prior, major publishers held press conferences, typically as a live presentation in a large theater with streaming broadcast, or through streaming pre-recorded segments, highlighting the new games that are planned for the next year. During the show proper, developers and publishers ran exhibition booths that allowed industry members, the press, retail representatives, and the public to try out the new games and talk with the creators. Several side events were held in nearby venues, including video game tournaments.

As with E3 2017 and E3 2018, the ESA offered up to 15,000 public-access badges to the event.

The ESA's prior contract with the Los Angeles Convention Center had expired with E3 2019, and the ESA has stated they may be looking to other venues for E3 2020 and beyond. ESA has asked the Convention Center and city for additional space nearby, and while there are plans to open up more by 2020, the ESA remained unsure if this will be sufficient for the next show. The ESA eventually renegotiated with the Convention Center through 2023, though have left the option to break their contract if desired.

Sony Interactive Entertainment announced that they would not be attending E3 2019, after having been a presence in all shows since the show's inception. Sony's CEO Shawn Layden stated in a February 2019 interview that with changes in retailer procurement, their own switch to fewer but more quality titles, and the rapid spread of news via the Internet that having a trade show as late as June was no longer helpful, and that Sony had to create its own Destination PlayStation experience in February as to secure retailer sales. Both Microsoft and Nintendo stated they would still attend E3. Due to the lack of Sony's presence, the show drew about 3,100 fewer attendees from E3 2018, for a total attendance of 66,100.

Press conferences

Microsoft

Microsoft held its press conference at the Microsoft Theater on June 9, 2019. They also demonstrated games through Inside Xbox on June 10, 2019. Among games promoted during the presentation included The Outer Worlds, Bleeding Edge, Ori and the Will of the Wisps, Minecraft Dungeons. Star Wars Jedi: Fallen Order, Blair Witch, Cyberpunk 2077, Spiritfarer, Battletoads, The Legend of Wright, Microsoft Flight Simulator, Age of Empires II: Definitive Edition, Wasteland 3, Psychonauts 2, Lego Star Wars: The Skywalker Saga, Dragon Ball Z: Kakarot, 12 Minutes, Way to the Woods, Gears 5, Dying Light 2, Forza Horizon 4: Lego Speed Champions, State of Decay 2: Heartland, Phantasy Star Online 2, Crossfire X, Tales of Arise, Borderlands 3, and Elden Ring. Microsoft also announced its acquisition of Double Fine and the publishing rights to its upcoming Psychonauts 2.

Service and hardware announcements by Microsoft included a Windows 10 version of the Xbox Game Pass subscription service (which would be included in a larger "Game Pass Ultimate" service, bundled with the console version and an Xbox Live Gold subscription), that its "Project xCloud" cloud gaming platform would receive a public beta in late-2019, as well as an updated version of the Elite controller.

Microsoft also teased "Project Scarlett", a successor to Xbox One.

During the presentation for Cyberpunk 2077, Keanu Reeves briefly took the floor revealing that he was voicing for a character in his likeness for the game. As he came out, one fan yelled out "You're breathtaking!", to which Reeves pointed and replied back to the audience, "You're breathtaking! You're all breathtaking!" Reeves' phrase since became an Internet meme. In planning for E3 2020, ESA president Stanley Pierre-Louis said that the unexpected Reeves moment was something they were inspired by and wanted to help set the potential for in E3 2020 and future expositions.

Bethesda Softworks
Bethesda Softworks had its press conference on June 9, 2019. Featured games included Fallout 76, The Elder Scrolls: Blades, Ghostwire: Tokyo, The Elder Scrolls Online, Commander Keen Mobile, The Elder Scrolls: Legends, Rage 2, Wolfenstein: Cyberpilot, Wolfenstein: Youngblood, Deathloop, and Doom Eternal. They also revealed their Orion software, a middleware package that is aimed to help improve the speed and latency for playing games over a stream.

Devolver Digital
Devolver Digital presented its third "Big Fancy Press Conference"—continuing on from the storyline of previous installments with a "Devolver Direct" presentation directly parodying those of Nintendo. The pre-recorded video showcased several games, including  Carrion, Fall Guys: Ultimate Knockout, a new free DLC for The Messenger, and Devolver Bootleg—a compilation of several "bootleg" versions of existing Devolver titles (including Enter the Gun Dungeon and Hotline Milwaukee among others). Devolver also announced Enter the Gungeon: House of the Gundead, a spin-off arcade light gun shooter game.

PC Gaming Show
PC Gamer presented its PC Gaming Show event on June 10, 2019. Among developers and publishers presented included Annapurna Interactive, Chucklefish, Digital Extremes, Digital Uppercut, Epic Games, E-WIN, Fatshark, Fellow Traveller, Frontier Developments, Funcom, Modus Games, Paradox Interactive, Perfect World Entertainment, Raw Fury, Rebellion, Re-Logic, and Tripwire Interactive. Among games presented include Evil Genius 2, Vampire: The Masquerade – Bloodlines 2, Starmancer, Chivalry 2, Mosaic, Quantum Error, Midnight Ghost Hunt, Unexplored 2: A Wayfarer's Journey, Mutant Year Zero, Conan Unconquered, Moons of Madness, Conan: Chop-Chop, Last Oasis, Age of Wonders: Planetfall, Zombie Army 4, Remnant: From the Ashes, Griftlands, Planet Zoo, Battletoads, Sayonara Wild Hearts, Shenmue III, Songs of Conquest, Warhammer: Vermintide 2, Per Aspera, Ancestors: The Humankind Odyssey, Auto Chess, CrisTales, Valfaris, Borderlands 3, Maneater, Scavengers, Terraria, Firewall: Zero Hour, Telling Lies, Warframe, Dragon Age 4, Genesis Noir, El Hijo, and Baldur's Gate III.

Ubisoft
Ubisoft broadcast its press conference on June 10, 2019. Among featured games included Watch Dogs: Legion, Tom Clancy's Rainbow Six Siege, Brawlhalla, Tom Clancy's Ghost Recon Breakpoint (including a brief presentation by Jon Bernthal), Tom Clancy's Elite Squad, Just Dance 2020, For Honor, Tom Clancy's Rainbow Six Quarantine, Tom Clancy's The Division 2, Roller Champions, and Gods and Monsters.

Ubisoft announced its "UPlay Plus" subscription service to its catalog of games for PC users and later on Stadia, starting in September 2019. In addition to games, Ubisoft announced that there would be an Assassins' Creed symphonic tour in 2019, featuring music from the various games. Rob McElhenney announced that he would be producing and starring in a series inspired by Ubisoft called Mythic Quest for Apple TV+.

Square Enix 
Square Enix streamed its announcement broadcast on June 10, 2019. This slot has been previously occupied by Sony and has used it for its press conference in previous years. Featured games included: Final Fantasy VII Remake, Life Is Strange 2, Final Fantasy Crystal Chronicles, Octopath Traveler, The Last Remnant Remastered, Dragon Quest Builders 2, Dragon Quest XI S, Circuit Superstars, Kingdom Hearts III, Battalion 1944, Final Fantasy XIV, Dying Light 2, Romancing Saga 3, SaGa: Scarlet Grace, Final Fantasy Brave Exvius, War of the Visions: Final Fantasy Brave Exvius, Outriders, Oninaki, Final Fantasy VIII, and Avengers.

Nintendo
Nintendo held an E3 Nintendo Direct presentation on June 11, 2019. Games featured included Super Smash Bros. Ultimate, Dragon Quest XI, Luigi's Mansion 3, The Dark Crystal: Age of Resistance Tactics, The Legend of Zelda: Link's Awakening, Trials of Mana, Collection of Mana, The Witcher 3: Wild Hunt, Fire Emblem: Three Houses, Resident Evil 5, Resident Evil 6, No More Heroes III, Contra: Rogue Corps, Contra Anniversary Collection, Daemon X Machina, Panzer Dragoon, Pokémon Sword and Shield, Astral Chain, Empire of Sin, Marvel Ultimate Alliance 3: The Black Order, Cadence of Hyrule, Mario & Sonic at the Olympic Games Tokyo 2020, Animal Crossing: New Horizons, and a sequel to The Legend of Zelda: Breath of the Wild. Nintendo went into more details about these games and other titles through their Treehouse Live event streamed throughout the convention.

Other events

Stadia
While Google did not attend E3 2019, they presented detailed information about their Stadia game streaming platform on June 6, 2019 just prior to the event. Among games highlighted during the presentation for the Stadia platform included Baldur's Gate III, Ghost Recon Breakpoint, Gylt, Get Packed, Tom Clancy's The Division 2, and Destiny 2.

Bungie
Bungie held a streaming presentation on the upcoming changes to Destiny 2 on June 6, 2019, following Google's presentation on Stadia. Among major changes announced included the reveal of its next major expansion, Shadowkeep, the game adopting a free to play model, cross-save across platforms, shifting the PC distribution from Battle.net to Steam, and new support for Stadia.

Electronic Arts
As in the past few E3s, Electronic Arts (EA) did not participate directly with E3, but instead held its public EA Play event the week prior to E3, from June 8–9, 2019, at the Hollywood Palladium. EA did not have a media briefing and instead offered multiple livestreams on June 8, 2019 for its games, focusing on Star Wars Jedi: Fallen Order, Apex Legends, Battlefield V, FIFA 20, Madden NFL 20 and The Sims 4. During these streams, the company also announced three new titles for its EA Originals programs, RustHeart from GlowMade, Lost in Random from Zoink, and an unnamed title from Hazelight Studios.

UploadVR
UploadVR broadcast a pre-recorded presentation, including new game reveals, on June 10, 2019. Among featured games were: Budget Cuts 2: Mission Insolvency, Garden of the Sea, The Curious Tale of the Stolen Pets, Pistol Whip VR, Golem, Hotel RnR, I Expect You to Die: Seat of Power, Echo Arena, Arizona Sunshine, Hotdogs, Horseshoes & Hand Grenades, Angry Birds VR and Boneworks.

Limited Run Games 
Limited Run Games, a boutique publisher, broadcast its press conference on June 10, 2019. The company announced over fifty planned releases of various indie games for the Nintendo Switch, PlayStation 4, Nintendo 3DS, as well as several titles for the PlayStation Vita. Additionally, they announced planned collectors editions of several old LucasArts games from the Star Wars and the Monkey Island series.

The games that were announced included Night in the Woods for mobile devices. For the PlayStation Vita, their last physical games are Deadbolt, Guacamelee, Super Mutant Alien Assault, Pix the Cat, Revenant Dogma, Mutant Blobs Attack, Rocketbirds Hardboiled Chicken, Rocketbirds 2: Evolution, Atari Flashback Classics, Super Meat Boy, Damascus Gear Operation Osaka, Damascus Gear Operation Tokyo, and Metal Slug 3. They also launched a Power Rangers game called Power Rangers: Battle for the Grid.

AMD 
A first for the company, AMD hosted its first press conference, titled "Next Horizon Gaming", on June 10, 2019.

Kinda Funny Games 
Kinda Funny Games streamed its showcase on June 10, 2019. Among games shown included: CastleStorm 2, Stronghold: Warlords, Lucifer Within Us, Funtime, Half Past Fate, Superliminal, and Undying.

E3 Coliseum
E3 Coliseum, a side event designed around public interaction with the developers and publishers, returned to E3 this year. Among notable presentations include:
 Content developer/streaming service Netflix held a panel at E3 related to its content and associated video game efforts.
 Geoff Keighley hosted a Psychonauts 2 panel with Tim Schafer and Jack Black.
 Writers and producers of the TV series The Simpsons held a panel.
 Infinity Ward held a panel to discuss their new game, Call of Duty: Modern Warfare.

BAFTA Special Award
During E3, the British Academy of Film and Television Arts (BAFTA) held a special ceremony in Los Angeles to give Epic Games a BAFTA Special Award in Video Games for the company's "impact on the global games industry".

Esport events
Nintendo held competitions for Super Smash Bros. Ultimate and Splatoon 2, as well as a tournament for the recently announced Super Mario Maker 2 on June 8, 2019.

Epic Games held a two-day event at The Forum from June 14–15, 2019 to focus on several Fortnite activities. This included the second Fortnite Celebrity Pro-Am event, which was won by streamer Airwaks and musician RL Grime.

List of featured games 
This is a list of notable games that appeared at E3 2019 and its related events, listed by publisher or developer.

References

Further reading 

 
 
 

2019 in Los Angeles
2019 in video gaming
2019
June 2019 events in the United States